Acantholichen is a fungal genus in the family Hygrophoraceae. The genus was circumscribed by Norwegian lichenologist Per Magnus Jørgensen to contain the type, and at that time, only species, the basidiolichen Acantholichen pannarioides, discovered originally in Costa Rica in 1998. This species has a bluish, gelatinous thallus, and a fine, white powdery bloom covering the hairy upper surface; this surface is said to resemble "an unshaven chin". Five additional species, all basidiolichens, were added to the genus in 2016 following an in-depth analysis of specimens collected from the Galápagos, Costa Rica, Brazil and Colombia.

Species
Acantholichen albomarginatus 
Acantholichen campestris 
Acantholichen galapagoensis 
Acantholichen pannarioides 
Acantholichen sorediatus 
Acantholichen variabilis

See also

List of Agaricales genera

References

Hygrophoraceae
Basidiolichens
Agaricales genera
Lichen genera
Taxa named by Per Magnus Jørgensen
Taxa described in 1998